Walid Phares (born December 24, 1957) is a Lebanese-born American scholar and conservative political pundit.

He worked for the Republican presidential campaigns of Mitt Romney in 2012 and Donald Trump in 2016. He has also served as a commentator on terrorism and the Middle East for Fox News since 2007, and for NBC from 2003 to 2006.

A Maronite Christian, Phares has gained notoriety for his association with Lebanese Christian militias in the 1980s during the Lebanese Civil War, and for his anti-Islam views.

Early life and education
Phares is a Christian Maronite, Lebanese and American citizen. He was born in Lebanon on December 24, 1957, and grew up in Beirut and in his native village of Ghouma (Batroun District). He emigrated to the United States in 1990.

He holds undergraduate degrees in law, political science, and sociology from Saint Joseph University and the Lebanese University in Beirut. Following his undergraduate studies, Phares practiced law in Beirut for a period of time, then went on to obtain a master's degree in international law from the Jean Moulin University Law school in France and a PhD in international relations and strategic studies from the University of Miami.

Career

Academia 
Phares taught at the Department of International Relations at Florida International University (FIU) in 1992 and was a visiting professor of comparative politics at Florida Atlantic University (FAU) in Palm Beach County from 1993 to 1994. He was hired as a full-time professor of Middle East studies and international relations in the Department of Political Science at FAU in 1995. While at FAU, Phares sponsored the student organization Haiti Watch. In 2008 he became Coordinator of the Trans-Atlantic Parliamentary Group on Counter Jihadi-Terrorism. Since 2008, he has lectured at the National Intelligence University in Washington DC, at the Center for Counterintelligence and Security Studies (CI Center) in Virginia, and at the Daniel Morgan Academy, a Graduate School of National Security in Washington DC. He teaches at BAU International University in Washington, D.C. also serving as a university provost and as Director of Graduate Studies at the university.

Phares's resume says that he "taught Global Strategies at the National Defense University in Washington DC since 2006". A spokesperson for the National Defense University noted that Phares was employed as an "expert/consultant" from April 2011 to April 2012.

Political activism 
In 1984, Phares adhered to a small Lebanese political party of the center-left, the "Social Democratic Christian Union" – Union Sociale Démocratique Chrétienne (USDC). Phares has served as secretary general of the World Maronite Union, and secretary general of the World Lebanese Cultural Union.

Phares has testified before committees of the U.S. State, Justice, Defense and Homeland Security and the United States Congress. He briefed and testified to international bodies like the European Parliament and the United Nations Security Council on matters related to international security and Middle East conflict. He serves as an adviser to the Anti-Terrorism Caucus in the U.S. House of Representatives since 2007 and is a co-secretary general of the Transatlantic Legislative Group on Counter Terrorism, a Euro-American Caucus, since 2009. He has served on the Advisory Board of the Task Force on Future Terrorism of the Department of Homeland Security in 2006-2007 as well as on the Advisory Task force on Nuclear Terrorism in 2007. He lectures at defense and national security institutions and serves as a consultant on international affairs in the private sector.

Advisor to Mitt Romney 
Phares was appointed as foreign policy adviser to Mitt Romney for his 2012 presidential campaign. His appointment was met with criticism from the Council on American–Islamic Relations (CAIR), which described him as "an associate to war crimes" (due to his ties to the Lebanese Forces) and a "conspiracy theorist". The appointment also provoked negative reactions from Islamic studies academics Ebrahim Moosa and Omid Safi, however both scholars were described as militant Islamists by several pieces, including "Walid Phares vs the Middle East Studies" as well as the Center for a New American Security's Andrew Exum, who said that Phares was "widely viewed as an extremist".

Advisor to Donald Trump 
Phares worked as an advisor to presidential candidate Donald Trump in 2016; he was paid $13,000 per month by the campaign. Trump's choice of Phares renewed scrutiny and speculations about Phares' past alleged role as an ideologue to Lebanese Christian fighters during the Lebanese Civil War and his perceived far-right views as an academic and analyst of the Middle East region. His supporters argued that Phares had presciently discerned the threat of jihadist ideology and that he was eminently qualified for a senior post, and pointed to his strong pro-Israel track record.

Phases did not have a government post in the Trump administration.

Views and controversies

Association with Lebanese militant groups 
Phares has drawn controversy over his association with Lebanese militant groups in the 1980s during the Lebanese Civil War. According to The Washington Post, Phares "was a political adviser to Lebanese militants during their war against Muslim factions during the 1980s". Phares has said that he was only involved with the militants in a political capacity and that he has not been directly implicated in any acts of violence.

Abed Ayoub, the national legal and policy director for the American-Arab Anti-Discrimination Committee, criticizes Phares saying: "If you look at his history, he was a warmonger and he shouldn't be near the White House. He was part of a militia that committed war crimes and, if anything, he should be tried for war crimes." Sarah Stern, president of the Endowment for Middle East Truth, defended his actions for the Lebanese militant group: "He represented his left-of-center party within a coalition of parties that oversaw the local government of the Christian community when it was surrounded by the Syrian army and the terrorist groups between 1986 and 1988. Phares is being attacked because he is on the right side of the issues and is fearless in speaking out the truth... [Walid] is in a caliber of his own. He understood the rise of radical Islam in the Middle East. He understood very early on what ISIS is, that it's a real threat. He understands that Islam is more than a religion, that it's also an ideology and an ideology of conquest."

Barack Obama and Hillary Clinton conspiracy theories 
Phares has asserted that the Barack Obama administration supported the Muslim Brotherhood. In October 2016, he asserted that "the triangle Clintonmachine-Iranregime-MuslimBrotherhood has unleashed a coordinated propaganda offensive" against Donald Trump.

Israel 
Phares has said that "[Israel's] only rational and historical choice is to link up once more with the Christian community of Lebanon. This may represent a choice which may not be appreciated among many Israelis, for various reasons, but it remains one which cannot be avoided... The Christians of Lebanon are the only potential ally against the advance of the northern Arabo-Islamic threat against Israel."

2017 Westminster attack 
In March 2017 Phares attracted attention in the UK when he implied in a tweet that London had "shut down" in the wake of the terrorist attack in Westminster, despite most roads and tube stations (with the exception of the adjacent Westminster station) remaining open as normal, and the fact that only the immediate crime scene was cordoned off: many Londoners replied to Phares to refute his claim.

Views on Islam 
According to The New York Times, Phares "regularly warns that Muslims aim to take over American institutions and impose Sharia, a legal code based mainly on the Quran that can involve punishments like cutting off the hands of a thief." He has been described as an early advocate of Bat Ye'or's dhimmitude concept. Phares has also asserted that jihadists are posing as civil rights advocates.

Phares has been described as being part of "the Islamophobia industry, a network of researchers who have warned for many years of the dangers of Islam and were thrilled by Mr. Trump’s election." According to Lawrence Pintak of the Atlantic Council and a member of the advisory board for The Media Majlis at Northwestern University in Qatar, Phares is a "card-carrying Islamophobe". Although Phares is often described as a scholar on terrorism, Stanford University terrorism expert Martha Crenshaw stated that Phares was "not in the mainstream as an academic". Duke sociologist Christopher A. Bail describes Phares as an influential figure in the anti-Islam movement. Phares has served on the board of advisors of anti-Muslim groups ACT for America and the Clarion Project, and has been described as part of the counter-jihad movement by Hope not Hate.

According to The New York Times, Phares "is regularly accused by Muslim civil rights groups of being Islamophobic and of fear-mongering about the spread of Sharia law."

Writings

Books
référence : Jean-Marc Aractingi, La politique à mes trousses, Paris, Éditions l'Harmattan, 2006

References

External links
 Author's Website
 

1957 births
Florida Atlantic University faculty
American Maronites
Counter-jihad activists
Counterterrorism theorists
Lebanese emigrants to the United States
Lebanese Maronites
Living people
People from Batroun District
American critics of Islam
University of Miami alumni